Coyote (2002) is a  science fiction novel by American writer Allen Steele.  The book is a compilation of some of Steele's short stories into one novel. Perspective is taken from many of the major characters of the book.

Coyote is part of a trilogy which includes Coyote Rising and Coyote Frontier. There are three spinoff novels, Spindrift, Galaxy Blues, and Hex, which are set in the same universe, although not directly tied to the events in Coyote. The series is continued by the Coyote Chronicles, a two-book series, including Coyote Horizon, released in March 2009 and Coyote Destiny, which was released on March 2, 2010.

Plot summary 

The year is 2070. The United Republic of America, under an authoritarian conservative New Christian Right regime constructed after the Second American Revolution, is managed by Liberty Party autocrats. It faces economic sanctions from other powers due to its repressive and xenophobic policies, notably its unilateral establishment of an orbiting nuclear weapons delivery system. The nation has built its first starship: the URSS Alabama. The welcoming celebration for Captain Robert E. Lee takes a sudden turn when Lee initiates his plan to steal the Alabama. Working with a handful of conspirators, Lee manages to alter the computer software and override the clearance codes. URS soldiers storm aboard to stop Lee, but they are too late. Not wishing to abandon their orders, Colonel Reese and the other soldiers become stowaways.

Captain Lee knew exactly what he was doing. His destination: the 47 Ursae Majoris system, some 46 light years away—far enough to escape the tyrannical United Republic. At a cruise velocity of .2c, Alabama would not arrive at its destination until 230 earth years have passed. So the crew of 104 soldiers, scientists, and civilians were put in biostasis, to be awakened from their virtual immortality by the ship's AI 226 years into the future. (Four years are spared due to time dilation.) 47 Ursae Majoris' system has four planets- named Fox, Raven, Bear and Wolf after Native American mythology. Bear has six satellites- Dog, Hawk, Eagle, Coyote, Snake and Goat. Of these six, Coyote is large enough to support its own biosphere.

Just three months into the journey, something goes terribly wrong. Leslie Gillis, the senior communications officer, is awakened from biostasis. Expecting the year to be 2300, Gillis is horrified when he questions the AI. There was a mix up, and now it is inexplicably impossible for Gillis to return to his dreamless sleep. His gruelling options are either suicide or a lonely existence surviving off the ship's supplies. While suicide may be more honorable than devouring his crewmates’ rations, Gillis chooses life.

After a brief chat with the AI, Gillis learns that Eric Gunther was originally scheduled to awake three months into the trip. Gunther is an agent for the URA, and would attempt to contact the president, or destroy the ship. The program was changed at the last minute to wake someone else instead - Les Gillis. Gillis leaves a note for Captain Lee explaining Gunther's plans for treason. Why they were changed at the last minute remains a mystery, but it was a change that would cost Gillis his life.

During Leslie Gillis’ solitary life, he did everything he could to keep from going insane, attempting to eat and sleep at regular hours, reading all of the books which were on board, playing chess against the AI, writing stories, and painting. Using practically all of the ship's art supplies, Gillis created a story about a prince named Rupurt and the fantastic alien world he lived in. He painted scenes of his books on the ship's inside walls. Eventually, Gillis died in his old age after a fall from a ladder while trying to get a better look at an alien ship he had seen. The AI automatically expelled his body into space with the arms of a maintenance bot, and the ship sailed on to 47 Ursae Majoris with no more incidents.

The crew is awakened as planned in the year 2300. The Alabama has entered the 47 Ursae Majoris system and is approaching its third planet, Bear. Bear (currently known as 47 Ursae Majoris b) is a gas giant that orbits 47 Ursae Majoris at 2.1 AUs and Coyote, its fourth moon, is larger even than Mars. This habitable satellite is lush with green plants and rivers of water. This will be the crew's new home. Captain Lee directs the landing procedures of the two ships docked to the Alabama, the Wallace and the Helms.

The crew finds Coyote to be habitable, but very peculiar nevertheless. Coyote's seasons change at a much slower rate than Earth's. A year for Coyote consists of 1,096 days with 27 hours per day. Life forms on Coyote seem similar to those on Earth at first glance, but behave in unique ways. As described in Gillis’ novel, the world is home to gigantic bird-like creatures which are anything but friendly. The settlers call them "boids", which was Gillis’ term for the beasts in his novel. Boids are common in the grasslands around the new settlement.

The remainder of Coyote tells of the adventures of Carlos Montero and Wendy Gunther along the banks of the equatorial river which stretches around Coyote.

Characters 
Captain Robert E. Lee, the leader and Captain of the URSS Alabama
Colonel Gill Reese, a URS soldier
Leslie Gillis, the senior communications officer
Eric Gunther, a URA agent
Wendy Gunther, Eric Gunther's teenage daughter
Jorge and Rita Montero, civilians who help to steal the Alabama
Carlos Montero, the son of Jorge and Rita

See also

 Lemarean Calendar
 Political ideas in science fiction

Notes

2002 American novels
2002 science fiction novels
2070